The Grand Inquisitor, introduced simply as The Inquisitor and also known as the Master of the Inquisitorius, is a fictional character in the Star Wars franchise. Voiced by Jason Isaacs, he is featured as the main antagonist of the first season of the animated series Star Wars Rebels (2014–2018), after being introduced as a Pau'an Temple Guard in Star Wars: The Clone Wars (2008–2014; 2020), who defects from the order during Order 66 and is tasked to hunt down all remaining Jedi by Darth Sidious in its aftermath. Following his suicide, the Grand Inquisitor's redeemed spirit — The Sentinel — aids Kanan Jarrus against the Inquisitorius, knighting him as a Jedi, before being enslaved by the Sith as a Temple Guard once more.

Created by Dave Filoni, based on a character concept from the Star Wars and Dark Empire Sourcebooks, the Grand Inquisitor reappeared in Marvel Comics' 2017–2018 comic book series Star Wars: Darth Vader: Dark Lord of the Sith, written by Charles Soule, and the 2022 Disney+ series Obi-Wan Kenobi, written by Joby Harold and directed by	Deborah Chow, both prequels exploring him leading the Inquisitorius in the aftermath of the Clone Wars after defecting from his Jedi temple guard position, while unsuccessfully attempting to hunt down Obi-Wan Kenobi. The character also reappears in the 2020 fourteenth volume of Star Wars (also written by Soule), a sequel storyline in which his Force spirit faces Luke Skywalker in combat.

Isaacs' performance as the Grand Inquisitor received positive critical reception, leading to interest in him reprising his role in live-action media on Disney+. Ultimately, Rupert Friend was cast as the Grand Inquisitor in the live-action limited series Obi-Wan Kenobi, set four years before Rebels and ten years after The Clone Wars and Star Wars: Episode III – Revenge of the Sith.

Concept and creation
The concept of a Grand Inquisitor originated from the 1987 Star Wars Sourcebook by Bill Slavicsek and Curtis Smith, where the death of "Torbin, the Grand Inquisitor" is mentioned in passing; in the 1989 edition, a photograph of Max von Sydow as Ming the Merciless from the 1980 Flash Gordon film is used to represent the character. In the 1993 Dark Empire Sourcebook by Michael Allen Horne and Carol Hutchings, an outline of the role of Torbin and the Sith Inquisitorius as conceived of by Slavicsek and Smith was written — Force-wielders affiliated with the Sith (but not Sith themselves) who would hunt Jedi on the behest of Darth Sidious following Order 66. After another Grand Inquisitor, Ja'ce Yiaso, was included as an antagonist of the Star Wars Galaxies expansion pack Jump to Lightspeed, a succession of Grand Inquisitors leading the Inquisitorius were introduced in the novel series Star Wars: The Last of the Jedi, written by Jude Watson from 2005 to 2008 and set between Star Wars: Episode III – Revenge of the Sith and Episode IV – A New Hope; these works (and many others) were rebranded as Star Wars Legends and rendered non-canon in 2014 by Lucasfilm following the company's purchase by the Walt Disney Corporation, with a new version of the group, initially embodied by a lone Inquisitor (voiced by Jason Isaacs) visually based on "Torbin, the Grand Inquisitor", reentering canon in the 2014 3D animated television series Star Wars Rebels, created by Dave Filoni, Simon Kinberg, and Henry Gilroy, and described as an "intimidating figure" and "Jedi Hunter" active during the same time period as the book series, designed to avoid being a "carbon copy" of Darth Vader or Darth Maul with a "creaturely, terrifying, and nightmarish look."

Referred to simply as "The Inquisitor" in the first season, the character is posthumously rebranded "The Grand Inquisitor" in the second season and all subsequent media featuring the character, where-in his former subordinates, the Inquisitorius, compete to succeed him as the group's leader, establishing the group to hold an "acolyte, monastic sensibility where they're stripped of their names, but they know, in order, which one they are."

Characterization and portrayal
The Grand Inquisitor is voiced by Jason Isaacs in the first two seasons of the Disney XD animated series Star Wars Rebels (2014–2016). Despite Isaacs' interest in reprising the role in live-action, Rupert Friend was cast to portray the Grand Inquisitor in the Disney+ live-action limited series Obi-Wan Kenobi (2022).

Appearances

Television series

The Clone Wars (2008–2014; 2020)

In October 2015, Dave Filoni revealed that the Grand Inquisitor had first appeared in Star Wars: The Clone Wars, although the audience watching was unaware of it. At a later press conference to promote the Star Wars Rebels second season finale "Twilight of the Apprentice", Filoni confirmed the character had previously appeared in The Clone Wars fifth season finale "The Wrong Jedi," as one of the Jedi Temple Guards who escorted Ahsoka Tano from the Jedi Temple and brought Barriss Offee to trial before Palpatine (after "Shroud of Darkness" had established as a former Jedi Temple Guard), with Barris' subsequent speech on the Jedi Council's culpability in the Clone Wars and injustice Ahsoka faced causing him to have lost faith in the Jedi Order.

Rebels (2014–2016)

In the 2014–2015 first season of Rebels, the Pau'an known as "The Grand Inquisitor" first appears in the extended cold opening of the series premiere "Spark of Rebellion", where he is ordered by Darth Vader on behalf of the Emperor to hunt down "the children of the Force" in addition to the Jedi survivors of Order 66 he had been hunting, after the Emperor had foreseen that one such child could be responsible for his own defeat. After learning of the existence of Kanan Jarrus and Ezra Bridger, the Grand Inquisitor personally elects to hunt them down, enlisting Imperial Agent Kallus to help him hunt down the rebels in their company. After failing to do so several times, the Inquisitor manages to capture Kanan. He tortures him and interrogates him about the Rebels' whereabouts, but to no avail, prompting Grand Moff Tarkin to suggest that they take him to Mustafar, where Vader's castle is located. In "Fire Across the Galaxy", Kanan is rescued by Ezra, and the Jedi engage in a lightsaber duel with the Inquisitor, who scars Bridger. After being defeated by Kanan, the Grand Inquisitor commits suicide by allowing himself to fall into an exploding reactor core after Kanan refuses to kill him, as he feared his punishment for failure.

In the 2015–2016 second season of Rebels, the Grand Inquisitor's death is revealed in "Always Two There Are" to have caused his former subordinates, the Inquisitorius, to compete to take his former position as leader, each seeking to hunt down Kanan due to him being the one to have defeated him. In "Shroud of Darkness", the redeemed spirit of the Grand Inquisitor (summoned by Yoda) — now known as The Sentinel — appears to Kanan in the Jedi Temple on Lothal, revealed to have once been a member of the Temple Guard, and a fallen Jedi Knight. After defeating Kanan in lightsaber combat and helping him realize that he cannot protect Ezra from "everything" forever, the Sentinel dubs Kanan a Jedi Knight before calling upon the spirits of other Temple Guards to hamper the Inquisitors "Fifth Brother" and "Seventh Sister" in their pursuit of Kanan, Ezra, and Ahsoka Tano, who are surprised to see their former leader's spirit facing them in combat.

Obi-Wan Kenobi (2022)

In February 2022, Rupert Friend was announced to have been cast as the Grand Inquisitor in the live-action limited series Obi-Wan Kenobi, set five years before Star Wars Rebels and ten years after Star Wars: The Clone Wars and Star Wars: Episode III – Revenge of the Sith.

The Grand Inquisitor, along with the Fifth Brother and the Third Sister, hunt for any remaining Jedi they can find, arriving on Tatooine, where they find and execute a young human who revealed himself to be a fugitive Jedi after using the force to save a civilian. Later on the planet Daiyu, The Grand Inquisitor is furious to discover that Reva has kidnapped a young Leia Organa for use as bait to lure Obi-Wan Kenobi out of hiding. Eventually Reva confronts Kenobi in a cargo bay before he can escape with Leia in a shuttle. The Grand Inquisitor arrived right before Reva engages Kenobi, ordering her to stand down, so he take care of Kenobi himself. Angry that he would take credit for Kenobi's capture, Reva stabs the Grand Inquisitor in the stomach. This also proves a long enough distraction for Kenobi to escape with Leia. Following their escape, Reva reports to Darth Vader, blaming Kenobi for his apparent death. Vader dismisses him as unimportant, offering her his position of Grand Inquisitor if she succeeds in finding Kenobi.

Reva is given the title of Grand Inquisitor by Vader as reward for tracking Kenobi and a group of force-sensitive refugees to the planet Jabiim. However, the original Grand Inquisitor is revealed to have survived Reva's betrayal, attributed to his thirst for revenge, and retakes his position as leader of the Inquisitorius when Reva is wounded by Vader as she attempts to assassinate the Dark Lord.

Literature

Ahsoka (2016)

In the 2016 novel Ahsoka, the Grand Inquisitor dispatches a member of his Inquisitorius — the Sixth Brother — to the farming moon of Raada to investigate claims of an unknown Force-sensitive resistance leader — Ahsoka Tano — after the Empire learns of their presence. In the epilogue, after learning of the Sixth Brother's death at Ahsoka's hands upon traveling to Raada himself, the Grand Inquisitor leaves to inform Darth Vader that they had found evidence of another survivor of Order 66, unaware of her identity.

Darth Vader: Dark Lord of the Sith (2017–2018)

In the 2017–2018 comic book series Star Wars: Darth Vader: Dark Lord of the Sith, set immediately after the events of The Clone Wars and Star Wars: Episode III – Revenge of the Sith, Darth Sidious recruits the former Temple Guard as Grand Inquisitor of the Inquisitorius, sparing him from Order 66, promising the former Jedi Knight the chance to read through the secrets of the Jedi Archives, which Jedi librarian Jocasta Nu had kept from him. Weeks later, after finding the newly-armoured Darth Vader in the archives, the Grand Inquisitor mistaking him for a Jedi and Vader mistaking the Grand Inquisitor for another secret apprentice of Sidious', the pair begin dueling, before Vader damages the Grand Inquisitor's lightsaber and the duel is broken up by Sidious, who brings Vader to the Inquisitorius Headquarters to meet with the other Inquisitors. Sometime later, Nu, having remained hidden in the library, confronts the Grand Inquisitor upon finding him going through the archives, who almost kills her before Vader intervenes and apprehends her; after Nu reveals Vader's identity as Anakin Skywalker to nearby clones, Vader kills them all (then Nu) to prevent this information from becoming public knowledge, leaving the secretly-watching Grand Inquisitor in awe of his power. Over the following years, the Grand Inquisitor is trained by Vader and leads the Inquisitorius in hunting down various Jedi survivors, standing by as Vader later purges dissenters from within the Inquisitorius ranks, declaring his eternal loyalty to the Dark Lord of the Sith.

Force Collector (2019)
In the 2019 young adult novel Force Collector, set sometime before the events of Star Wars: The Force Awakens, a Force-sensitive boy, Karr Nuq Sin, discovers the Grand inquisitor's former lightsaber, consequentially experiencing visions of himself as the Grand Inquisitor hunting down and killing Jedi, before having a vision of facing himself. Upon confiding in his great-grandfather, Naq Med, Karr learns he was the Jedi Padawan the Grand Inquisitor had been facing, who (questioning the idea of blind allegiance) had left the Jedi Order years before the Clone Wars and having a wife and daughter, but had been tracked down and hunted by the Grand Inquisitor as a part of Order 66 (sometime before events of Rebels) nonetheless (despite attempts to explain that he believed Darth Sidious' claims about an attempted Jedi insurgency), managing to break the Grand Inquisitor's lightsaber before fleeing to the planet Pam'ba (abandoning his family to protect them), where he lived out the rest of his natural life.

"The Orphanage" (2020)
In the 2020 short story "The Orphanage" in the Dark Legends collection, an in-universe "ghost story" of ambiguous continuity, the Grand Inquisitor is prevented from taking Force-sensitive children from an orphanage on the planet Gaaten by a surviving Jedi, Kira Vantala, and a refugee named Elish, before fleeing the planet, never to return.

The Destiny Path (2020)

In the 2020 fourteenth volume of Marvel's Star Wars comic book series, The Destiny Path, set immediately after the events of The Empire Strikes Back, the Grand Inquisitor's spirit — now eternally burning in the flames which consumed him — is revealed to have since been trapped on the Outer Rim planet of Tempes by Darth Vader, serving as a guardian over an abandoned High Republic-era Jedi outpost. After Luke Skywalker arrives at the temple looking for an ancient lightsaber, after losing his own, he is defeated in combat. After Vader arrives shortly afterward, he expresses his displeasure with the Grand Inquisitor's failure. Before leaving, the Grand Inquisitor asks Vader whether there is any chance that he could be released, only to be dismissed, Vader calling the Grand Inquisitor a "tool" for his own purposes before leaving. Lamenting over his fate, fading away into the flames, the Grand Inquisitor speaks of how "There are worse things than death."

Video games
The Grand Inquisitor also appears in several Star Wars video games, as described below:

 The Grand Inquisitor is an antagonist in the now-defunct game Star Wars Rebels: Recon Missions, released by Disney Mobile on iOS, Android and Windows Store, a side-scrolling, run-and-gun platform game.
 The Grand Inquisitor is represented as a pig in Angry Birds Star Wars II, in its Rebels level set.
 The Grand Inquisitor is a collectible add-on character for the toys-to-life video game Disney Infinity 3.0.
 The Grand Inquisitor is one of the several bonus characters available as downloadable content for Lego Star Wars: The Force Awakens, as part of the Star Wars Rebels character pack.
 The Grand Inquisitor appears in the mobile MOBA Star Wars: Force Arena as a playable Dark Side squad leader.
 While not appearing in person or heard by the player, the Grand Inquisitor is spoken to by the Inquisitor Ninth Sister in Star Wars Jedi: Fallen Order (set five years after the events of Revenge of the Sith).
 The Grand Inquisitor is an unlockable character in the turn-based role-playing game Star Wars: Galaxy of Heroes, as the last of six Inquisitor characters introduced in early 2022 that must be unlocked with all the other five.

Merchandising
Hasbro released a  Grand Inquisitor action figure as part of its Rebels Saga Legends series of figures in 2013 and 2014, ahead of the series premiere of Star Wars Rebels.

References

Sources

Further reading

External links
 
 

Animated characters introduced in 2014
Villains in animated television series
Characters created by Dave Filoni
Extraterrestrial supervillains
Fantasy television characters
Fictional assassins
Fictional characters without a name
Fictional energy swordfighters
Fictional henchmen
Fictional humanoids
Fictional hunters
Fictional government agents
Fictional kidnappers
Fictional mass murderers
Fictional suicides
Fictional telekinetics
Fictional torturers and interrogators
Fictional war veterans
Fictional warlords
Inquisition in fiction
Male characters in animated series
Male characters in television
Male supervillains
Star Wars animated characters
Star Wars characters who are Force-sensitive
Star Wars Jedi characters
Star Wars comics characters
Star Wars literary characters
Star Wars: The Clone Wars characters
Star Wars Rebels characters
Star Wars video game characters
Television characters introduced in 2013
Television characters introduced in 2014
Animated characters introduced in 2013